Kids America was a 90 minute syndicated public radio show for young children. It was broadcast from 1984 to 1987 on weeknights on public radio stations in the United States by American Public Radio, the forerunner of Public Radio International.  First produced by WNYC in New York City as Small Things Considered, it won a Peabody award in 1984. In October 1985 the show's name was changed to Kids America. At the time of its 1987 cancellation, the program was carried by 26 stations.

Characters/Segments 
The show was hosted by Kathy O'Connell and Larry Orfaly. After its cancellation, O’Connell continued her career in radio hosting Kids Corner on WXPN in Philadelphia. Each 30 minute segment on Kids America featured a character or guest. These included:
Dr. Rita Book (E. A. "Betsy" Hass)
Xeno The Alien (Dan Hagen)
Martha’s Mishaps (Martha Dodge)
The Duke of Words (Stuart Leigh) 
Marcy’s Party (Marcy Mankoff)
Susan’s Songs (Susan Dias)
Mother Nature 
 Al Unctuous
 Dr. Fad (Ken Hakuta)

A wide variety of music was also played from rock music to classical music during each half-hour segment. The show's engineer was David Nolan.

Cancellation 
The final show aired on Christmas Eve 1987 after the Corporation for Public Broadcasting decided not to renew a grant which provided funding for the program. WNYC, the station which produced Kids America declined to pursue other underwriting possibilities.  At its cancellation, the show drew phone calls from over 6,000 children per week. One of the difficulties of the show, and children's radio in general in the US, is that radio ratings do not count listeners less than 12 years old. This created a lack of incentive for radio stations to carry Kids America or any other children's radio programming.

The cancellation of Kids America left the United States with no nationally distributed radio programs aimed at children until the premiere of Radio AAHS in 1990.

References 

American children's radio programs
American public radio programs
1984 radio programme debuts
1989 radio programme endings